Young Women's Leadership Academy at Arnold is an all girls' middle and high school in Grand Prairie, Texas. It is a part of the Grand Prairie Independent School District. The school is part of the Young Women's Preparatory Network and as an average of 1400 students: 1,200 middle school and 200 high school students. 
As a college preparatory school, it offers two career pathways (which is a great contrast to other GPISD high schools such as Dubiski Career High School or South Grand Prairie High School) Fashion and Business as well as STEM.

Academic courses 

The Young Women's Leadership Academy, offers two career pathways for high school students allowing them to graduate with a distinction when completed. The first pathway is Fashion and Business, in which students take fashion and business courses that increase in content at each level. The second pathway, STEM, is centered around engineering and technology. Classes include concepts of engineering and design, biotechnology, and advanced biotechnology.

In the core classes, students are give the opportunity to be part of the Pre-AP and AP program. Middle schoolers can take Pre-AP math, science, ELA, and social studies courses while high schoolers can take Pre-AP English I and II then proceed to take AP English Language and Composition and AP English Literature. High school students can take Pre-AP Biology, Chemistry, Geometry, and Algebra I. Because of the involvement in the Texas Dual Credit Program, high schoolers can take Dual Credit Physics, US History, World History, and English. YWLA students can also participate in Grand Prairie ISD's Education & Leadership Preparatory Program in collaboration with the University of Texas at Arlington, under which they would receive teachers aide positions in Grand Prairie and then contracts as full-time GPISD teachers once they completed their degrees and received their certification.

Clubs and organizations 
 National Junior Honor Society
 National Honor Society
 DECA
 Biology Club
 YMCA Youth and Government
 SkillsUSA
 Keep Grand Prairie Beautiful Adopt-a-street program

References

External links
 

Girls' schools in Texas
Grand Prairie Independent School District high schools
Public middle schools in Texas
Public girls' schools in the United States
Buildings and structures in Grand Prairie, Texas